Chapel Hill is an unincorporated community in southwest Lafayette County, in the U.S. state of Missouri. The community is on Missouri Route Z approximately six miles south of Bates City.

History
A post office called Chapel Hill was established in 1850, and remained in operation until 1914. The community took its name from the local Chapel Hill College; the school was destroyed during the Civil War in the 1860s.

References

Unincorporated communities in Lafayette County, Missouri
Unincorporated communities in Missouri